The 64th Scripps National Spelling Bee was held in Washington, D.C. at the Capital Hilton on May 29–30, 1991, sponsored by the E.W. Scripps Company.

The winner was 13-year-old Joanna Lagatta of Clintonville, Wisconsin, spelling "antipyretic" for the win. Second place went to 11-year-old Maria Mathew of Sterling, Illinois, who missed "". The final two girls competed against each other for almost 90 minutes before a winner emerged.

There were 227 spellers this year, 113 girls and 114 boys, from age 10–15. Six were appearing for at third time, and 35 were appearing for a second time.

The first place prize (in addition to non-cash prizes) was $5,000. Second place received $4,000.

As of 2016, Lagatta has been the only bee winner from Wisconsin.

References

Scripps National Spelling Bee competitions
1991 in Washington, D.C.
1991 in education
May 1991 events in the United States